Andrei Anghel (born 17 November 1989) is a Romanian luger who has competed since 2004. His best finish at the FIL World Luge Championships was 16th in the men's doubles event at Lake Placid, New York in 2009.

Anghel qualified for the 2010 Winter Olympics where he finished 20th in the doubles event.

References

External links
 

1989 births
Living people
Lugers at the 2010 Winter Olympics
Olympic lugers of Romania
Romanian male lugers